Germany participated in the Eurovision Song Contest 2013 with the song "Glorious" written by Yann Peifer, Manuel Reuter, Andres Ballinas and Tony Cornelissen. The song was performed by Cascada. The German entry for the 2013 contest in Malmö, Sweden was selected through the national final Unser Song für Malmö, organised by the German broadcaster ARD in collaboration with Norddeutscher Rundfunk (NDR). The national final took place on 14 February 2013 and featured ten competing acts with the winner by the votes of a five-member expert jury panel, a radio vote and a public vote. "Glorious" performed by Cascada was selected as the German entry for Malmö after gaining the most points following the combination of votes.

As a member of the "Big Five", Germany automatically qualified to compete in the final of the Eurovision Song Contest. Performing in position 11, Germany placed twenty-first out of the 26 participating countries with 18 points.

Background 

Germany has won the contest on two occasions: in 1982 with the song "Ein bißchen Frieden" performed by Nicole and in 2010 with the song "Satellite" performed by Lena. Germany, to this point, has been noted for having competed in the contest more than any other country; they have competed in every contest since the first edition in 1956 except for the 1996 contest when the nation was eliminated in a pre-contest elimination round. In 2012, the German entry "Standing Still" performed by Roman Lob placed eighth out of twenty-six competing songs and scoring 110 points.

The German national broadcaster, ARD, broadcasts the event within Germany and delegates the selection of the nation's entry to the regional broadcaster Norddeutscher Rundfunk (NDR). NDR confirmed that Germany would participate in the 2016 Eurovision Song Contest on 27 May 2015. In 2010 and 2012, NDR had set up national finals in the format of a talent show to choose both the song and performer to compete at Eurovision for Germany, while a single-artist national final was organised in 2011 to choose the song to compete for Germany. On 22 November 2012, the broadcaster announced that they would organise a multi-artist national final to select the German entry.

Before Eurovision

Unser Song für Malmö 

Unser Song für Malmö (English: Our Song for Malmö) was the competition that selected Germany's entry for the Eurovision Song Contest 2013. The competition took place on 14 February 2013 at the TUI Arena in Hanover, hosted by Anke Engelke. Collaboration with private broadcaster ProSieben terminated after three years, however like in the previous three years, the national final was co-produced by the production company Brainpool, which also co-produced the 2011 Eurovision Song Contest in Düsseldorf and the 2012 Eurovision Song Contest in Baku. Twelve acts competed during the show with the winner being selected by a combination of votes from an expert jury panel, radio voting and public voting. The show was broadcast on Das Erste as well as online via the broadcaster's Eurovision Song Contest website eurovision.de and the official Eurovision Song Contest website eurovision.tv. The national final was watched by 3.24 million viewers in Germany.

Competing entries 
Twelve acts were selected by a seven-member panel consisting of Thomas Schreiber (ARD entertainment coordinator), Jörg Grabosch (Brainpool managing director) as well as representatives of record companies Universal Music, Sony Music, Warner Music Entertainment, EMI and Embassy of Music. Eleven of the participating acts were announced on 17 December 2012 and the twelfth act was announced on 21 December 2012.

Final 
The televised final took place on 14 February 2013. The winner, "Glorious" performed by Cascada was selected through a combination of votes from a five-member jury panel (1/3), radio voting (1/3) and public voting (1/3), including options for landline and SMS voting. The jury panel consisted of Tim Bendzko (singer-songwriter), Roman Lob (singer, German Eurovision entrant in 2012), Anna Loos (actress and singer), Mary Roos (singer and actress, German Eurovision entrant in 1972 and 1984) and Peter Urban (musician and radio host, German commentator for the Eurovision Song Contest). For the radio vote, listeners were able to vote via the official websites of the nine ARD radio channels between 7 February 2013 and 14 February 2013. Over 837,700 public votes were cast in the final.

Controversy 
Following Cascada's victory at the German national final, "Glorious" has come under investigation by NDR following allegations that the song is a copy of the Eurovision Song Contest 2012 winning song "Euphoria" by Loreen. On 19 February, NDR spokeswoman Iris Bents reported that the results of the study would be published when they were available but played down the allegations, stating that "every year there are attempts to create scandals around the Eurovision Song Contest and the participants". On 25 February, it was announced that "Glorious" was cleared of plagiarism and would remain as the German entry for the 2013 Eurovision Song Contest.

At Eurovision
According to Eurovision rules, all nations with the exceptions of the host country and the "Big Five" (France, Germany, Italy, Spain and the United Kingdom) are required to qualify from one of two semi-finals in order to compete for the final; the top ten countries from each semi-final progress to the final. As a member of the "Big 5", Germany automatically qualified to compete in the final on 18 May 2013. In addition to their participation in the final, Germany is also required to broadcast and vote in one of the two semi-finals. This was decided via a draw held during the semi-final allocation draw on 17 January 2013, and Germany was assigned to broadcast and vote in the second semi-final on 16 May 2013.

In Germany, the first semi-final was broadcast on EinsFestival and on delay on NDR Fernsehen, the second semi-final was broadcast on Phoenix and on delay on EinsFestival and NDR Fernsehen, and the final was broadcast on Das Erste. All broadcasts featured commentary by Peter Urban. The German spokesperson, who announced the top 12-point score awarded by the German jury during the final, was 2010 contest winner Lena.

Final 
During the German delegation's press conference on 15 May 2013, Cascada took part in a draw to determine in which half of the final the German entry would be performed. Germany was drawn to compete in the first half. Following the conclusion of the second semi-final, the shows' producers decided upon the running order of the final. The running order for the semi-finals and final was decided by the shows' producers rather than through another draw, so that similar songs were not placed next to each other. Germany was subsequently placed to perform in position 11, following the entry from Russia and before the entry from Armenia.

The German performance featured the lead singer of Cascada Natalie Horler performing on stage wearing a champagne beige glittered dress designed by Katja Convents. The performance also featured a glass staircase which Horler stood at the beginning, as well as flames and shots during the first chorus and a pyrotechnic waterfall effect during the last chorus. The two backing vocalists that joined Horler on stage were Elli Azuro and Rayla Sunshine. Although the song was widely tipped to do well, being the second favourite to win with the British Bookmakers and also being number 6 in Austrian Airplay and number 21 in British Airplay in the week leading up to the contest, Germany placed twenty-first in the final, scoring 18 points.

Voting 
Voting during the three shows involved each country awarding points from 1-8, 10 and 12 based on the results of their professional jury and televoting. Each nation's jury consisted of five music industry professionals who are citizens of the country they represent, with their names published before the contest to ensure transparency. This jury judged each entry based on: vocal capacity; the stage performance; the song's composition and originality; and the overall impression by the act. In addition, no member of a national jury was permitted to be related in any way to any of the competing acts in such a way that they cannot vote impartially and independently. The members that comprised the German jury were Lena, Tim Bendzko (singer-songwriter), Alina Süggeler (singer), Carolin Niemczyk (singer) and Florian Silbereisen (singer and television presenter).

Below is a breakdown of points awarded to Germany and awarded by Germany in the second semi-final and grand final of the contest:

Points awarded to Germany

Points awarded by Germany

References

External links

Official NDR/ARD Eurovision site

2013
Countries in the Eurovision Song Contest 2013
Eurovision
Eurovision
Eurovision